Bertil Nordqvist is a Swedish ski-orienteering competitor and world champion.

Ski orienteering
He competed at the 1996 World Ski Orienteering Championships in Lillehammer, where he won a gold medal in the relay event, together with Per-Ove Bergqvist, Mikael Lindmark and Björn Lans. He has received one individual silver medal and two bronze medals in the world championships.

At the World Cup in Ski Orienteering in 2003 Nordqvist finished overall second, behind winner Eduard Khrennikov. He finished overall third in 1997 and in 1999.

References

Year of birth missing (living people)
Living people
Swedish orienteers
Male orienteers
Ski-orienteers